Evening Party in the Studio on Strandvejen (Danish: Aftenselskab i atelieret på Strandvejen) is a 1905 oil-on-canvas group portrait painting by Laurits Tuxen depicting a social gathering in the artist's home on Strandvejen in Copenhagen. In 2019, it was acquired by Skagen Museum.

History
Lauritz Tuxen resided at Strandvejn 24 from 1901 to 1909. He began working on the painting in April 1904 and it was completed for the Charlottenborg Spring Exhibition the following year. The painting was shortly thereafter sold to a private buyer. It remained in the hands of the same family for more than one hundred years. In 2019, it was acquired by Skagen Museum with economic support from the Augustinus Foundation and the Ny Carlsberg Foundation.

Description
The painting shows a social gathering in Tuxen's stidio. The people seen in the painting are:

 Anna Bissen
 Yvonne Tuxen
 Mary Henningsen
 Vilhelm Bissen
 Helga Weis
 Valdemar Irminger
 Anna Ancher
 Nicoline Tuxen
 Michael Therkildsen
 A. P. Weis
 Jørgen Møller
 Peder Severin Krøyer
 Nina Tuxen
 Frederikke Tuxen
  Julie Scharling
 Fru Hornemann
 Michael Ancher
 Frans Schwartz
 Erik Henningsen
 Laurits Tuxen
 Eduard Saltoft
 Aage Roose
 Hans Christian Kofoed
 Esther Paulsen
 Julius Paulsen,
 William Scharling

References

External links

 Source

Paintings by Laurits Tuxen
Group portraits by Danish artists
Cultural depictions of Peder Severin Krøyer
1905 paintings